William Lowndes Calhoun (July 13, 1884 – October 20, 1963) was a United States Navy officer who served in World War I and World War II, eventually attaining the rank of Admiral during World War II.

Early years
William Lowndes Calhoun was a native of Palatka, Florida. He joined the U.S. Navy in about 1902, and graduated from the United States Naval Academy in 1906. Among his classmates were many future admirals including Roland M. Brainard, Arthur L. Bristol, Milo F. Draemel, Robert L. Ghormley, William A. Glassford, Charles C. Hartigan, Aubrey W. Fitch, Frank J. Fletcher, Isaac C. Kidd, John S. McCain Sr., Leigh Noyes, Ferdinand L. Reichmuth, Sherwoode A. Taffinder, John H. Towers, Russell Willson, Raymond A. Spruance, and Thomas Withers.

Naval service
Calhoun served in various assignments until 1915 when he qualified as a submariner.

His shore assignments between 1915 and 1937 included service as Inspector of Ordnance at Mare Island Naval Shipyard, training at the Naval War College, and duties at the San Diego Naval Base.

From about 1937 to about 1939 he served as Commanding Officer of the battleship . From December 1939 he served as Commander Base Force, Pacific Fleet. On 27 February 1942 his title changed to Commander Service Force, Pacific Fleet (ComServPac). He served in this capacity until the 13 March 1945 when he was assigned to command the South Pacific Area. He served in this capacity until October 1945.

Retirement
Calhoun retired on 1 December 1946. He died in 1963 at a naval hospital.

He was a great-grandson of U.S. Vice President John C. Calhoun.

Decorations and awards

Submarine Warfare Insignia

  Navy Distinguished Service Medal with gold star.
  Legion of Merit with gold star and 'V' device.
  Nicaraguan Campaign Medal
  World War I Victory Medal
  American Defense Service Medal
  American Campaign Medal
  Asiatic-Pacific Campaign Medal with two bronze stars.
  World War II Victory Medal

See also

World War I
World War II

References/ Sources

 History of United States Naval Operations in World War II (Samuel Eliot Morison).
 Hyperwar Naval Chronology 
 Time Magazine Article 
 

1884 births
1963 deaths
United States Navy admirals
United States Naval Academy alumni
Burials at Fort Rosecrans National Cemetery
United States Navy World War II admirals
People from Palatka, Florida
Recipients of the Navy Distinguished Service Medal
Recipients of the Legion of Merit
Military personnel from Florida
Calhoun family
United States Navy personnel of World War I